Yin Mengdie (born 17 November 1997) is a Chinese canoeist. She competed in the women's K-1 200 metres and the K-1 500 metres  events at the 2020 Summer Olympics.

References

External links
 

1997 births
Living people
Chinese female canoeists
Canoeists at the 2020 Summer Olympics
Olympic canoeists of China